Avex Taiwan Inc (formerly 艾迴唱片公司 or 艾迴股份有限公司) is an entertainment and record label based in Taiwan. It was founded in July 1998 and is a foreign consolidated subsidiary of parent company Avex Group, based in Japan. As of 2015, Avex Taiwan is managed by Avex International Holdings (Singapore) Proprietary Ltd. (It became a foreign consolidated subsidiary after Avex Group's restructure in April 2004.) Its main businesses are planning, creation, and sales of music (CDs) and video (DVDs). Apart from producing music for artists based in Taiwan, it also distributes for other Avex and foreign artists, such as Kumi Koda and Super Junior.

Avex Taiwan is one of the "Big Four" record labels in Taiwan with Universal Music/EMI/What's Music International, Warner Music Taiwan/Gold Typhoon and Sony Music Taiwan.

In September 2013, the company's consultant, Li Tian-do, announced that the company will withdraw from Chinese music segment, due to poor sales of Chinese music segment.

Current artists

Local
Note: Singers are at the time of withdrawal from Chinese music division. Distributions are excluded.
 Alan
 Angelababy
 Angelica He
 Ariel Lin
 Dance Flow
 Danson Tang
 Eddie Peng 
 Jessie Chiang
 Joe Cheng
 RelaxOne
 Shin - former lead singer of Taiwanese rock band Shin
 Xiaoyu Sung

Korean
 10cm
 After School
Astro
 BoA
 Clazziquai Project
 EXO
 EXO-M
 f(x)
 gugudan
 Henry Lau
 Kangta
 Lena Park
 Loveholic
 Orange Caramel
 SM The Ballad
 Shinee
 Super Junior
 Super Junior-M
 TRAX
 TVXQ
 U-KISS
 Urban Zakapa
 VIXX
 W & Whale
 Winterplay
 Zhang Liyin

Japanese
 244 Endli-x+
 AAA
 Acid Black Cherry
 Arashi+
 Cheeky Parade
 Da Pump
 Deep
 Dream
 E-Girls
 Gackt
 Half Life
 Hey! Say! JUMP+
 Hideaki Takizawa
 Hitomi
 Iconiq
 J Soul Brothers
 Jake Shimabukuro+
 KAT-TUN+
 Kazuki Kato
 Ketsumeishi+
 KinKi Kids+
 Kis-My-Ft2
 Kumi Koda
 Lands+
 Livetune+
 Moumoon
 Namie Amuro
 NEWS+
 NYC+
 ravex
 Saori@destiny+
 Super Girls
 Tegomass+
 Tokio+
 Tokyo Girls' Style
 V6
 Yuzu+
note:+non-Avex Japan

International
 BT
 Armin van Buuren
 FPM
 Max Graham
 Emma Hewitt
 A. J. McLean
 John O'Callaghan
 Paul Potts
 Daniel Powter
 Markus Schulz
 Roger Shah
 Connie Talbot
 Tiësto

Former artists

Local
 A-Lin (2005 to 2013) - moved to Sony Music Taiwan
 Shino Lin - one of the first Avex's artists in Taiwan
 5566 (2002 to 2004) - moved to Warner Music Taiwan
 Awaking (元衛覺醒) (2004 to 2007) - moved to EMI Music Taiwan
 Cyndi Wang (2003 to 2008) - moved to Gold Typhoon (Taiwan)
 Show Lo (2003 to 2007) - moved to EMI Music Taiwan; then reforming to Gold Typhoon (Taiwan)
 Wu Bai (2003 to 2010) - moved to Universal Music Taiwan
 Shin (band) (except former lead singer Shin) (2002 to 2006) - moved to Music Nation Wingman Limited; then moved to Skyhigh Records
 Angela An

Japanese
 Bright - disbanded
 Daishi Dance (2010) - released "The Ghibli Set" under the label. Currently signed to Universal Music
 Luna Sea (2011 to 2012) - moved to Universal Music

Korean
 Girls' Generation (2007 to 2010) - distribution moved to Universal Music but merchandise remains at Avex Taiwan as part of SM Official Goods Store Taiwan Branch

Distributed labels
 Johnny & Associates
 SM Entertainment (except Girls' Generation)
 Fluxus Entertainment
 Toy's Factory (since 2012)

See also
 List of record labels

References

External links
  
 
  

Taiwanese record labels
Pop record labels
Rock record labels
Avex Group